White Bluff(s) may refer to several places in the United States:

Places 
White Bluff, Georgia, a former community, now a part of Savannah, Georgia
White Bluff, Tennessee
White Bluffs, Washington

Other uses 
White Bluff (Demopolis, Alabama), a national historic site
White Bluff Formation, a geologic formation in Arkansas
White Bluff Power Plant, a coal-fired power station in Arkansas

See also